Denhamia is a genus of plants within the family Celastraceae, with species in Australia and New Caledonia. The species inhabit a variety of environments, from rainforest to semi-arid savanna. All species grow as shrubs or small trees up to 10 metres in height. The genus is composed of nine species, with two currently unnamed species:

Denhamia celastroides
Denhamia fournieri
Denhamia moorei
Denhamia obscura
Denhamia oleaster
Denhamia parviflora
Denhamia pittosporoides
Denhamia pittosporoides subsp. pittosporoides
Denhamia pittosporoides subsp. angustifolia
Denhamia viridissima
Denhamia sp. Jardine River
Denhamia sp. Junee Tableland

Some authors regard Denhamia as a paraphyletic genus which should properly include the Australasian Maytenus species.

References

McKenna, M.J., M.P. Simmons, C.D. Bacon and J.A. Lombardi. 2011. “Delimitation of the segregate genera of Maytenus sensu lato (Celastraceae) based on morphological and molecular characters.” Systematic Botany 36: 922–932.

Celastraceae
Celastrales genera
Flora of Australia